Air Lease may refer to:
 Air Lease Corporation, a major international aircraft leasing company headquartered in Los Angeles
 Aircraft lease, leases used by airlines and other aircraft operators
 Commercial Aircraft Sales and Leasing